Charles Millington (25 April 1882 – 22 June 1945) was an English professional footballer who played for Aston Villa, Fulham and Birmingham in the Football League. He played mainly as an outside right, and was noted for his pace.

References

1882 births
1945 deaths
Sportspeople from Lincoln, England
English footballers
Association football wingers
Grantham Town F.C. players
Aston Villa F.C. players
Fulham F.C. players
Birmingham City F.C. players
Telford United F.C. players
Brierley Hill Alliance F.C. players
Stourbridge F.C. players
Oakengates Athletic F.C. players